The 2018 League of Ireland Premier Division was the 34th season of the League of Ireland Premier Division. The league began on 16 February 2018 and concluded on 26 October 2018.

On 5 October, Dundalk won the title after a 1–1 draw with St Patrick's Athletic.

Overview
The Premier Division consists of 10 teams. Each team plays each other four times for a total of 36 matches in the season.

Waterford, the 2017 First Division champion, were promoted to the league for the first time since 2007.

On 22 December 2016, the Football Association of Ireland announced that the league would be restructured into two 10-team divisions from the 2018 season onwards, one of the recommendations made in the 2015 Conroy Report.

Teams

Stadia and locations

Personnel and kits

Note: Flags indicate national team as has been defined under FIFA eligibility rules. Players may hold more than one non-FIFA nationality.

Managerial changes

League table

Results

Matches 1–18
Teams played each other twice (once at home, once away).

Matches 19–36
Teams will play each other twice (once home, once away).

Promotion/relegation playoff
Limerick, the ninth-placed team from the Premier Division took part in a two-legged play-off against Finn Harps, the winners of the 2018 First Division play-off, to decide who will play in the 2019 Premier Division.

Finn Harps won 3–0 on aggregate and were promoted to 2019 Premier Division. Limerick were relegated to the 2019 First Division.

Season statistics

Scoring

Top scorers

Hat-tricks

Discipline

Club

Most yellow cards: 94 
Sligo Rovers

Most red cards: 7
Waterford

Awards

Player of the Month

Player of the Year

Goalkeeper of the Year

See also
 2018 League of Ireland First Division
 2018 FAI Cup
 2018 League of Ireland Cup
 2018 St Patrick's Athletic F.C. season

References

External links
 Official website
 Full Results and Fixtures

 
1
League of Ireland Premier Division seasons
1
Ireland
Ireland